Kenneth W. Rosemond (October 30, 1930 – April 10, 1993) was an American college basketball coach.  Rosemond played college basketball at the University of North Carolina under future Hall of Fame coach Frank McGuire and was a member of the school's first national championship team, the undefeated 1956–57 Tar Heel squad.

Following his college career, Rosemond became a coach.  He was Dean Smith's first assistant coach, serving on Smith's staff from 1961 until 1965.  He was then named head coach at the University of Georgia, where he coached for seven seasons, from 1965 until he was dismissed in 1973, compiling a record of 92–111 (.453).

Rosemond died on April 10, 1993.

References

1930 births
1993 deaths
American men's basketball coaches
American men's basketball players
Basketball coaches from North Carolina
Basketball players from North Carolina
College men's basketball head coaches in the United States
Georgia Bulldogs basketball coaches
North Carolina Tar Heels men's basketball coaches
North Carolina Tar Heels men's basketball players
People from Hillsborough, North Carolina
Guards (basketball)